Klaus Pringsheim Sr. (24 July 1883 – 7 December 1972) was a German-born composer, conductor, music-educator and the twin brother of Katharina "Katia" Pringsheim, who married Thomas Mann in 1905.

Biography 
Pringsheim was the son of mathematician and artist Alfred Pringsheim and his wife Hedwig Dohm Pringsheim, who was an actress in Berlin before her marriage. His son, historian  (23 May 1923 – 6 February 2001), attended Bunce Court School, a German Jewish refugee school in Kent, England during World War II.

A former pupil of Gustav Mahler, Pringsheim Sr. was invited to Tokyo in 1931 to become professor of music at the Tokyo National University of Fine Arts and Music. Known for establishing and propagating Western classical music in Japan, Pringsheim had a great influence on many later Japanese musicians. Among his famous students are Kōmei Abe, Kozaburo Hirai and Isotaro Sugata.

See also
Dohm–Mann family tree

References 

1883 births
1972 deaths
19th-century German male musicians
20th-century classical composers
20th-century German conductors (music)
20th-century German composers
20th-century German educators
20th-century German male musicians
20th-century Japanese composers
20th-century Japanese educators
20th-century Japanese male musicians
German emigrants to Japan
19th-century German Jews
German male classical composers
German male conductors (music)
German music educators
German Romantic composers
Japanese classical composers
Japanese conductors (music)
Japanese Jews
Japanese male classical composers
Japanese male conductors (music)
Japanese music educators
Japanese Romantic composers
Jewish classical musicians
Musicians from Munich
People from the Kingdom of Bavaria